Changua (milk broth with eggs) is a typical hearty breakfast soup of the central Andes region of Colombia, in particular in the Boyacá and Cundinamarca area, including the capital, Bogotá. It also has a reputation as a hangover cure, being a popular late night meal.

The changua comes from the Muisca word XIE which means water or river, and NYGUA that means salt. A mixture of equal amounts of water and milk is heated with a dash of salt. Once it comes to a boil, one egg per serving is cracked into the pot without breaking the yolk, and allowed to cook for about a minute while covered. The broth is served in a bowl, garnished with scallions, which may be fried beforehand but usually are not, curly cilantro, and a piece of stale bread called "calado" which softens in the changua. It is sometimes served with pieces of cheese which melt into the broth.

Modern versions of changua include chicken stock instead of water, tomato concassé, chopped cilantro, almojábana and "Choclo" arepas.

See also
 List of soups

References 

Colombian soups
Egg dishes